Qezel Kan (also known as Qezel Kand) is a village in Chenaran Rural District, in the Central District of Chenaran County, Razavi Khorasan Province, Iran. At the 2006 census, its population was 821, in 175 families.

References 

Populated places in Chenaran County